The Connecticut State Treasurer serves the office of treasurer for the state of Connecticut.

List of State Treasurers

External links

TREASURERS
Connecticut: State Treasurers

 
1639 establishments in Connecticut